Adel Maïza (born March 18, 1983) is an Algerian retired football player who played as a defender for USM Annaba.

Honours

Club
 ES Sétif
Algerian Ligue Professionnelle 1 (1): 2006-07
Arab Champions League (2): 2006-07, 2007-08

 Al Ahli Jeddah
Gulf Club Champions Cup (1): 2008

References

External links

Adel Maïza at Footballdatabase

1983 births
Algerian footballers
Living people
Algeria international footballers
ES Sétif players
Expatriate footballers in Saudi Arabia
Algerian expatriate footballers
CS Constantine players
Algerian Ligue Professionnelle 1 players
Algeria A' international footballers
USM Annaba players
USM Alger players
People from Annaba
Algeria under-23 international footballers
2011 African Nations Championship players
JSM Béjaïa players
Algerian expatriate sportspeople in Saudi Arabia
Algeria youth international footballers
Al-Ahli Saudi FC players
JS Kabylie players
MC El Eulma players
Saudi Professional League players
Association football defenders
21st-century Algerian people